In the United States, Smarties are a type of tablet candy produced by Smarties Candy Company, formerly known as Ce De Candy Inc., since 1949. Smarties are produced in factories in both Union Township, New Jersey, and Newmarket, Ontario. The candies distributed in Canada are marketed as Rockets, to avoid confusion with Smarties, a chocolate candy produced by Nestlé which owns the trademark in Canada. The New Jersey factory produces approximately 1 billion rolls of Smarties annually, and in total the company produces over 2.5 billion in a year.

One individual candy is a biconcave disc in shape, with a diameter of roughly 1 cm (0.39 in) and a height of roughly 4 mm (0.16 in). Larger ones have a diameter of 2.5 cm (0.98 in) and are about 6 mm (0.24 in) thick. Smarties come in combinations of colors within their wrapped rolls; these include white and pastel shades of yellow, pink, orange, purple, and green. Each color's flavor is different. They are usually packaged as a roll of 15 candies. Smarties candies are peanut-free, gluten-free, fat-free and dairy-free. All Smarties candies are free of animal products and therefore vegan.

History

After World War II, the Dee family bought pellet machines and repurposed them to make candy.
This gave the candy its resemblance to tablet-style pills in shape and texture. When sugar prices spiked in the 1970s, Ce De Candy switched from sucrose to dextrose.

In 2004, Ce De Candy Co., Inc., in conjunction with Rock The Vote, manufactured 50 special edition Smarties with "Rock the Vote" on the wrapper. A 3.5-ounce Theater box was released in 2009, with a retro look on the boxes. In 2011, Ce De Candy Company, Inc. changed its name to Smarties Candy Company. In August 2011, the company confirmed that Smarties were vegan.

Production
The Smarties Candy Company operates two factories that produce Smarties 24 hours a day for five days a week, amounting to over 70,000 pounds (around 32,000 kilograms) per day. After mixing the dry ingredients they are pressed into tablets and then stacked and rolled into a Smarties wrapper for packaging.

Ingredients

The ingredients in Smarties candies are dextrose, citric acid, calcium stearate, natural and artificial flavors, and colors. There are 25 calories and 6.9 grams of sugar in a roll of Smarties.

Flavors

Each package contains an assortment of pastel colors  in the following flavors:
 White: orange cream

 Yellow: pineapple 
 Pink: cherry
 Green: strawberry
 Purple: grape
 Orange: orange

Smarties Candy Company also produces "X-treme sour" and "tropical" varieties of Smarties as well as lollipops in three sizes. In October 2015, the company launched Smarties 'n Creme, which are quarter-sized candy tablets with Smarties flavor on one side and creme flavor on the other.

See also
Necco Wafers
Parma Violets
SweeTarts

References

Further reading
"These Women Have Business Smart(i.e.)s"
"A Candy Crush on Smarties"

External links

Smarties website

Brand name confectionery
Products introduced in 1949
Candy